Whittemore Center Arena, known colloquially as The Whitt, is a multi-purpose arena in Durham, New Hampshire, United States, on the campus of the University of New Hampshire. It was built for $30 million and opened in November 1995. It was dedicated to Frederick B. Whittemore and his family on May 5, 1996. It is adjacent to its predecessor, Snively Arena, which is still standing and is used as a recreation facility. It is also adjacent to Durham's Amtrak station, and it is across the street from Wildcat Stadium.

The arena is home to the University of New Hampshire Wildcats men's and women's ice hockey teams. The hockey rink originally had a full Olympic-sized sheet of ice, but the rink was reduced slightly to "NHL size" during a 2022 renovation. In 2002, 2005 and 2016, UNH and the Whittemore Center hosted the NCAA Women's Frozen Four. The arena can seat 6,501 for hockey and basketball games, and 7,200 for concerts and similar events. The lobby is decorated with heroic portraits of past men's and women's All-American hockey players. Through the end of the 2006–2007 academic year, the arena was managed by Global Spectrum, but UNH Campus Recreation took over management before the 2007 academic year.

The basketball teams (which currently draw roughly 1,000 fans per game on average) normally play across the street at Lundholm Gymnasium, which is attached to Cowell Stadium. A few home basketball games have been held at the Whittemore Center. The arena is also a venue for many concerts, trade shows, and events.  The arena was New Hampshire's largest until the Verizon Wireless Arena (now the SNHU Arena) opened in Manchester in 2001.

The consecration of Bishop Gene Robinson occurred in this arena on 2 November 2003. Robinson is known for being the first openly gay bishop within the Episcopal Church.

In September 2015 a new high definition center-hung scoreboard was unveiled.

During the summer of 2017 the arena replaced its former HID fixture lighting system with a new LED lighting system which led to much more even lighting in the arena and no more loud hum produced by the former system.

In June and September 2020, the New Hampshire House of Representatives met in the arena due to social distancing requirements as a result of the COVID-19 pandemic.  In December 2020, both the House and Senate
met outside the arena. The House convened on the field hockey pitch in front of the arena. The Senate convened on a nearby parking lot, before joining the House for a joint convention on the field hockey pitch to certify the results of the 2020 general election and to elect the secretary of state and the state treasurer.

In April 2022, $6 million UNH spent on renovations, that included a ice size reduction to 200 x 90 foot.  The renovations also include installing new glass, a more forgiving NHL-style boards and a new sound system.

References

External links
Whittemore Center Arena official website

Indoor arenas in New Hampshire
Basketball venues in New Hampshire
College basketball venues in the United States
College ice hockey venues in the United States
Indoor ice hockey venues in the United States
Sports venues in New Hampshire
University of New Hampshire buildings
New Hampshire Wildcats men's basketball
Buildings and structures in Strafford County, New Hampshire
University and college buildings completed in 1995
1995 establishments in New Hampshire
Sports venues completed in 1995